Arriva UK Bus is a major bus operator in the United Kingdom based in Sunderland, England. It is a subsidiary of Arriva which runs transport services across Europe, which has been a subsidiary of Deutsche Bahn since 2010.

Arriva UK Bus operates 5,900 buses in London, the North East, North West and South East of England, Yorkshire, The Midlands and Wales. It employs 16,000 people.

Divisions
Arriva's bus network in the UK originates from its acquisition of Grey-Green in 1980 and British Bus in August 1996. It has the following operating units:

Former divisions
 Wardle Transport (later including D&G Bus) sold to D&G Bus in 2015
 Arriva Scotland West sold to McGill's Bus Services in March 2012
 The Original Tour sold to RATP Group in September 2014
 Tellings-Golden Miller sold to management in 2016
Yorkshire Tiger sold to Transdev Blazefield in 2021

Branding
Fleet livery is aquamarine and blue. Arriva London buses operating services for Transport for London are painted red. Yorkshire Tiger buses are painted in an orange livery and Tiger Blue blue. New Enterprise Coaches retains its existing white and red livery.

in some regions, premium services are operated under the Sapphire brand while interurban services are operated under the Max brand.

References

 
Bus groups in the United Kingdom